With a Smile could refer to:

Film and TV
With a Smile (TV series), a Filipino television series
With a Smile (film) (Avec le sourire), a 1936 Maurice Chevalier comedy film

Music

Albums
With a Smile, album by David T. Walker 2007
With a Smile and a Song (album), an album by Doris Day

Songs
"Avec le sourire" ("With a Smile"), 1907 song and comic routine by Maurice Chevalier, after which the 1936 film was named
"With a Smile" (Eraserheads song), a song by Filipino band Eraserheads
"With a Smile", song by Gladys Knight, composed by Peter Neville, from 1998 album Many Different Roads
"With a Smile", song by Ray Stevens from album Be Your Own Best Friend
"With a Smile", song by Royal Bliss from 2012 album Waiting Out the Storm 
"With a Smile and a Song" (song), a song written by Frank Churchill